The San Rafael Bridge is a bridge in Northern California

San Rafael Bridge may also refer to:
San Rafael Bridge (Pasadena), in Southern California
San Rafael Bridge (Utah), in Emery County, Utah